Recess Nunatak is a small but conspicuous nunatak 1 nautical mile (1.9 km) west of Mount Perkins, in the Fosdick Mountains of the Ford Ranges, Marie Byrd Land. Mapped by the United States Antarctic Service (USAS) (1939–41). Later mapped by United States Geological Survey (USGS) from surveys and U.S. Navy air photos (1959–65). So named by Advisory Committee on Antarctic Names (US-ACAN) because the nunatak is recessed in the ice at the base due to windscooping.
 

Nunataks of Marie Byrd Land